Sharyland Independent School District is a public school district based in Mission, Texas (USA).

The district serves parts of Mission, McAllen, Palmhurst, and Alton.

In 2009, the school district was rated "recognized" by the Texas Education Agency.

Schools

High School (Grades 9-12)
 Sharyland High School Home of the Rattlers
 Sharyland Pioneer High School Home of the Diamondbacks
 Sharyland Advanced Academic Academy Home of the Cobras

Junior High Schools (Grades 7-8)
 Sharyland North Junior High School
 B.L. Gray Junior High School

Elementary Schools (Grades PK-6)
 Jessie Jensen Elementary
 John H. Shary Elementary
 Lloyd & Dolly Bentsen Elementary
 Olivero Garza Sr. Elementary
 Romulo D. Martinez Elementary
 Ruben Hinojosa Elementary
 Donna Wernecke Elementary
 Harry Shimotsu Elementary

References

External links
 

School districts in Hidalgo County, Texas
Education in McAllen, Texas
Mission, Texas